The 8th Street Fountain was erected in 1927 and was created by architects Bennett, Parsons, and Frost.  It is located in Chicago's Grant Park in the U.S. state of Illinois.

History
Architect and planner Edward H. Bennett was hired to complete Grant Park after the death of Daniel H. Burnham. Following Burnham's vision, Bennett's design for the park relied on a classical vocabulary with formal symmetry. The 8th Street Fountain is a more modest fountain compared to Bennett's larger Buckingham Fountain, both of which were constructed in 1927.

Originally three matching fountains were built along the Michigan Avenue edge of Grant Park. Of the three, only the 8th Street fountain still stands. Another stood at Randolph Street.

By the 1980s, much of Grant Park became neglected. Fountains stopped working, gardens were not maintained, and graffiti covered the balustrades.

In 2004, much of the north end of Grant Park was renovated to form Millennium Park.

See also
 1927 in art
 List of public art in Chicago

References

1927 establishments in Illinois
1927 sculptures
Fountains in Illinois
Outdoor sculptures in Chicago